The Emotions are an American soul/R&B vocal group from Chicago. The group started out in gospel music but transitioned into R&B and disco music. The Emotions were named by VH1 as one of the 18 most influential girl groups of all time.

History

Early career
The group was originally a gospel outfit known as the Hutchinson Sunbeams who toured the gospel circuit with their father Joe Hutchinson. The Sunbeams sang on Jerry Van Dyke’s “Children’s Gospel” television show and also occasionally performed in the concert with Mahalia Jackson. They eventually became an R&B/Soul act with a popular following in their hometown of Chicago, Illinois. Soon being renamed as The Emotions, they signed with the Memphis-based Volt imprint of Stax Records in the late 1960s. Under the production of Isaac Hayes and David Porter the group issued their 1969 debut album entitled So I Can Love You on Stax.

"So I Can Love You" rose to no. 43 upon the Billboard Top R&B Albums chart. The album's title track got to No. 3 on the Billboard Hot R&B Songs chart and No. 39 on the Billboard Hot 100 chart. Another single entitled "The Best Part Of A Love Affair" rose to no. 27 upon the Billboard Hot R&B Songs chart.

During 1970, The Emotions released a single entitled "Heart Association." That song reached No. 29 on the Billboard Hot Soul Songs chart. The girl group went on to release their sophomore LP entitled Untouched in 1972 upon Stax. A song from the album called "Show Me How" rose to No. 13 upon the Billboard Hot Soul Songs chart.

During 1972, the girl group also released another single called "My Honey and Me." That song reached No. 18 on the Billboard Hot Soul Songs chart.

The Emotions then started to work on their third studio album entitled Songs of Innocence and Experience. This LP was due to be issued in 1973, but was eventually shelved. The girl group went on to appear in the 1973 feature film Wattstax, performing the song "Peace Be Still." The tune went on to be added to the movie's soundtrack. Wattstax was also nominated for a Golden Globe in the category of Best Documentary. With Stax becoming defunct in 1975, the group then left the record label altogether.

Above and beyond
The group then joined up with Columbia Records where an association with Maurice White of Earth, Wind & Fire brought them their greatest level of success. With White and Charles Stepney on production, The Emotions issued in 1976 their third studio album Flowers on Columbia Records. Flowers rose to No.5 upon the Billboard Top R&B/Hip-Hop Albums chart and No. 45 on the Billboard 200. The album was also certified Gold in the US by the RIAA. The LP's title track got to No. 16 on the Billboard Hot R&B Songs chart. Another single called "I Don't Wanna Lose Your Love" rose to No. 4 on the Billboard Dance Club Songs chart and No. 13 on the Billboard Hot R&B Songs chart.

Following Charles Stepney's death in 1976, White took over producing the Emotions. During 1977 the group issued their follow up album entitled Rejoice The album reached No. 1 on the Billboard Top R&B Albums chart and No. 7 on the Billboard 200 chart. Rejoice has also been certified Platinum in the US by the RIAA.

With the LP came the single “Don't Ask My Neighbors" which got to the top ten on the Billboard R&B singles charts.
Another song called "Best of My Love" reached No. 1 on the Billboard Pop and R&B charts and won a Grammy for Best R&B Performance By a Duo or Group with Vocals, as well as an American Music Award for Favorite Soul/R&B Single. "Best of My Love" has also been certified Platinum in the US by the RIAA.

During summer 1978 The Emotions went on to issue their third Columbia album called Sunbeam. The album rose to No. 12 on the Billboard Top Soul Albums chart and No. 40 on the Billboard 200 chart. John Storm Roberts of High Fidelity stated ""Sunbeam" sparkles with good tracks." Glenn Clark of The Morning Call wrote "The best thing I can say about this LP is that I like it. The Emotions' brand of snappy and upbeat soul is good for my soul. Maurice White, guru of Earth, Wind & Fire, produced this album, and I think he has blended well the talent he has brought together."

Sunbeam has been certified Gold in the US by the RIAA. An album cut called Smile reached No. 6 on the Billboard Hot Soul Songs chart.

During 1979, Earth, Wind & Fire collaborated with The Emotions on the single "Boogie Wonderland". The song reached No. 6 and No. 2 on the Billboard Hot 100 and Hot Soul Songs charts. "Boogie Wonderland" has also been certified Gold in the US by the RIAA. Within October of that year the Emotions issued their follow up studio album again produced by White entitled Come into Our World upon Columbia, which rose to no. 35 upon the Billboard Top R&B Albums chart. Jon Wall of Melody Maker wrote "throughout Come into Our World The Emotions' superb vocal control, range and harmonic sense are displayed to maximum effect". Wall also added "Come into Our World is one of the most appealing albums I've heard since Off the Wall. I can't get the album off the turntable and I don't want to". Bill Rhedon of The Baltimore Sun noted that the album has "excellent material" with "simply steady, unvarying Coming at You, Soul." A song called "What's the Name of Your Love?" also got to no. 30 upon the Billboard Hot R&B Songs chart. As well Maurice White went on to be Grammy nominated in the category of Producer of the Year Non-Classical.

Wanda and Jeanette went on to appear on Jennifer Holliday's Grammy nominated 1983 LP Feel My Soul. Pamela and Wanda also featured on Earth, Wind & Fire's 1983 album Electric Universe.

The Emotions' eighth studio album entitled Sincerely was issued in 1984 on Red Label Records.  The album rose to No. 3 on the UK Blues & Soul Hiplist chart and No. 33 on the US Billboard Top Soul Albums chart. Dave Hillson of Blues & Soul said The Emotions "caught the mood of eighties Soul perfectly". Hugh Wyatt of the New York Daily News declared "this album is top shelf". As a single, "You're the One" reached  No. 19 on the UK Blues & Soul Hiplist chart and No. 34 on the US Billboard Hot R&B Songs chart. Another single called "You're the Best" rose to No. 33 on the US Billboard Dance Club Songs chart. During 1985 the group also issued their subsequent studio LP entitled If I Only Knew on Motown Records. The album got to No. 11 on the UK Blues & Soul Hiplist chart.

The Emotions went on to feature on Tyler Collins 1989 album Girls Nite Out. A song off the LP that the girl group sang on called "Watcha Gonna Do?" rose to No. 8 on the Billboard Hot R&B/Hip-Hop Songs chart.

Jeanette and Wanda then appeared upon EWF's 1990 album Heritage. The Emotions also guested upon Nancy Wilson's 1990 album A Lady with a Song and jazz group Urban Knights's 1995 LP Urban Knights I. They then featured on  LL Cool J's 1995 LP Mr. Smith which has been certified Double Platinum in the US by the RIAA. The Emotions also appeared on George Duke's 1995 album Illusions and the Gospel Gangstaz's 1996 album Do or Die. During 1998 they featured on an episode of Motown Live with fellow girl group Divine and made a guest appearance on Smokey Robinson's 1999 Grammy nominated album Intimate.

During 2000, Pamela eventually rejoined the group. A year later they were bestowed with the Pioneer Award from the Rhythm and Blues Foundation. The Emotions went on to guest upon Earth, Wind & Fire's 2003 album The Promise, which was produced by Maurice White. A song from the album featuring The Emotions called "All in the Way" rose to No. 13 on the Billboard Adult R&B Songs chart and No. 25 on the Billboard Adult Contemporary Songs chart. As well the group appeared on a 2004 PBS soul music special hosted by Patti LaBelle where they performed "Best Of My Love". Within September of that year, Songs of Innocence and Experience were finally released by Stax.

The Emotions went on to collaborate with rapper Snoop Dogg on a track called "Life" upon his 2006 album Tha Blue Carpet Treatment. The album has been certified Gold in the US by the RIAA. The Emotions also appeared as a guest artist upon Terrace Martin's 2016 Grammy nominated album Velvet Portraits.

Pamela's death
On September 18, 2020, Pamela Hutchinson died at the age of 61.

Legacy
The Emotions have been sampled by rappers such as Big Daddy Kane, Tupac Shakur, LL Cool J, Wu Tang Clan, 50 Cent, Ice Cube, Salt n Pepa, De La Soul, Kanye West, A Tribe Called Quest and Notorious BIG.

Artists such as Toni Braxton, 112, Mariah Carey, Lisa Lisa and Cult Jam, Mary J Blige, Ginuwine, Keyshia Cole, Tamia and Janet Jackson have also sampled the girl group.

Their songs have also been covered by artists such as Phoebe Snow, Minnie Riperton, Marcia Hines, Patti La Belle, Maysa, The Temptations, Will Downing and Nancy Wilson, and Bobby Caldwell

The Emotions have also influenced artists such as En Vogue, Anita Baker, Shanice, Regina Belle, Lalah Hathaway, Jade, Erykah Badu, Kirk Whalum, Sheena Easton, Teena Marie and Fantasia.

Accolades

Grammy Awards

|-
| style="text-align:center;"| 1978
| Best Of My Love
| Best R&B Vocal Performance by a Duo, Group or Chorus
| 
|-
| style="text-align:center;"| 1980
| Boogie Wonderland
| Best Disco Recording
| 
|-

Rhythm & Blues Foundation

|-
| style="text-align:center;"| 2001
| Rhythm & Blues Foundation
| Pioneer Award
| 
|-

Discography

References

External links
 The Emotions official website (inactive)
 
 

1962 establishments in Illinois
1985 disestablishments in Illinois
American disco girl groups
African-American girl groups
Family musical groups
Musical groups established in 1962
Musical groups disestablished in 1985
American funk musical groups
American soul musical groups
Columbia Records artists
Motown artists
Grammy Award winners
Stax Records artists